Cetobacterium ceti is a Gram-negative, and rod-shaped obligately anaerobic bacterium from the genus of Cetobacterium which has been isolated from sea mammals. Cetobacterium ceti represents a hitherto unknown line of descent peripherally  associated to the fusobacteria  and low G + C relatives. There is no growth of Cetobacterium ceti at 25°C or 45°C.

References

Fusobacteriota
Bacteria described in 1996